To Your Soul is the second studio album by American rapper and producer The Jaz, from New York, New York. It was released on July 16, 1990, via EMI USA.

Background
The album was recorded at D&D Studios, in New York City, New York, and was primarily produced by Jaz-O. The album also received production contributions from Prince Paul, Vandy C, and Chad Elliott. Jay-Z appears on two tracks. Despite the album not reaching the Billboard charts, its two singles, "The Originators" and "A Groove (This Is What U Rap 2)," peaked at No. 13 and No. 18, respectively, on the Hot Rap Songs chart.

Critical reception
Joshua Clover, in his book 1989: Bob Dylan Didn’t Have This to Sing About, called the album "vital, serious, deeply musical, with playful lyrics that come at varying speeds, sometimes blunt and heavy on the beat, sometimes syncopated and sudden, looking for a way to slip past any defense."

Track listing

Personnel
 Jonathan Burks – main performer, producer (tracks: 1, 3, 6-7, 9-10, 12-14)
 Shawn Corey Carter – featured performer (tracks: 2, 13) 
 Chad "Dr. Cuess" Elliott – producer (tracks: 3, 6, 9, 12) 
 Vandy Colter – producer (tracks: 5, 8, 11), engineering 
 Paul Edward Huston – producer (tracks: 2, 4) 
 Dwayne Alexander – executive producer 
 Gary Clugston – engineering 
 Kieran Walsh – engineering 
 Mike Rogers – engineering 
 Herb Powers Jr. – mastering 
 Henry Marquez – art direction 
 Lu Ann Graffeo – design 
 Jeffrey Scales – photography

Charts 
Singles

References

External links
 

1990 albums
Jaz-O albums
Albums produced by Prince Paul (producer)
Albums produced by Jaz-O
EMI Records albums